Heinrich Walter Guggenheimer (July 21, 1924 – March 4, 2021) was a German-born Swiss-American mathematician who has contributed to knowledge in differential geometry, topology, algebraic geometry, and convexity. He has also contributed volumes on Jewish sacred literature.

Heinrich Guggenheimer was born in Nuremberg, Germany. He is the son of Marguerite Bloch and the Physicist Dr. Siegfried Guggenheimer. He studied in Zurich, Switzerland at the Eidgenössiche Technische Hochschule, receiving his diploma in 1947 and a D.Sc. in 1951. His dissertation was titled "On complex analytic manifolds with Kahler metric". It was published in Commentarii Mathematici Helvetici:25:257–97 (in German).

Guggenheimer began his teaching career at Hebrew University as lecturer 1954–56. He was a professor at Bar Ilan University 1956–59. In 1959 he immigrated to the United States, becoming a naturalized citizen in 1965. Washington State University was his first American post, where he was an associate professor. After one year he moved to University of Minnesota where he was raised to a full professor in 1962. While in Minnesota he wrote Differential Geometry (1963), a textbook treating "classical problems with modern methods". According to Robert Hermann in 1979, "Among today's treatises, the best one from the point of view of the Erlangen Program is Differential Geometry by H. Guggenheimer, Dover Publications, 1977."

In 1967 Guggenheimer published Plane Geometry and its Groups (Holden Day), and moved to New York City to teach at Polytechnic University, now called Polytechnic Institute of New York University. In 1977 he published Applicable Geometry: Global and Local Convexity.

Until 1995 Guggenheimer produced a steady stream of papers in mathematical journals. As a supervisor of graduate study in Minnesota and New York he had six students proceed to Ph.D.s with theses supervised by him, two in Minnesota and four in New York. See the link to the Mathematics Genealogy Project below.

Guggenheimer has also contributed to literature on Judaism. In 1966 he wrote "Logical problems in Jewish tradition". The next year he contributed "Magic and Dialect" to Diogenes (15:80–6) where he examines the supposition that "knowledge of the right name gives power over the bearer of that name". In 1995 Heinrich Guggenheimer presented his A Scholar’s Haggadah, which makes a bilingual comparison of variances in the traditions of Passover observance. It includes Ashkenazic, Sephardic, and Oriental sources. His study of the Jerusalem Talmud provided text and commentary.

He died in March 2021 at the age of 96.

Family
On June 6, 1947, Heinrich married Eva Auguste Horowitz. Together they wrote Jewish Family Names and their Origins: an Etymological Dictionary (1992). They have two sons, Michael, a professor of Arabic,  and Tobias I. S., an architect,  and two daughters Dr. Esther Furman, a biochemist, and Hanna Y. Guggenheimer, an artist.

Notes

References
 Allen G. Debus, "Heinrich Walter Guggenheimer", Who's Who in Science, 1968.
 Heinrich Guggenheimer at Mathematics Genealogy Project.
 "Guggenheimer, Heinrich Walter" in American Men and Women of Science, 25th edition, Gale, 2008.

1924 births
2021 deaths
20th-century American mathematicians
21st-century American mathematicians
Differential geometers
German emigrants to the United States
Jewish emigrants from Nazi Germany to Switzerland
Polytechnic Institute of New York University faculty
Scientists from Nuremberg